A pyxis (plural pyxides) is a shape of vessel from the classical world, usually a cylindrical box with a separate lid. Originally mostly used by women to hold cosmetics, trinkets or jewellery, surviving pyxides are mostly Greek pottery, but especially in later periods may be in wood, metal, ivory, or other materials.  The name derived from Corinthian boxes made of wood from the tree puksos (boxwood), that also came with covers. The shape of the vessel can be traced in pottery back to the Protogeometric period in Athens, however the Athenian pyxis has various shapes itself.  

At first, the two varieties of pyxis included the pointed and the flat-bottomed. The pointed pyxis didn't last much longer than the ninth century BCE, while the flat-bottomed continued into the late Geometric.  It also continued to grow larger and more squat in proportions.  The cover often depicts elaborately sculpted handles and the walls tend to be somewhat convex. During the sixth century BCE, Athens began producing boxes with concave walls that enabled them to be grasped easily when arranged close together on a shelf.  Compare the waisted shape of the medieval and Early Modern albarello.  Images on the pyxis usually depict the marriage procession from a young girl's house to that of her new husband.

Pyx is a term for a specifically liturgical box, usually cylindrical, but of variable design, still used for holding and transporting consecrated hosts in the traditional Christian churches, a use to which the church began to put these boxes at a very early date.

Gallery

Ancient Greek pot shapes
Containers